is a Japanese manga series written and illustrated by Robico. It was serialized in Kodansha's manga magazine Dessert from August 2015 to December 2019, the chapters were published in seven tankōbon volumes.

In 2020, Our Precious Conversations won the 44th Kodansha Manga Award in the shōjo category.

Plot
Nozomi Aizawa meets and falls in love with Shiro Azuma in their fist year at Heiwadai High School. Too shy to talk to him, her feelings are kept secret until their second year, when she suddenly confesses to him at a train station. Shiro takes Nozomi's declaration of love as a joke, but from that day on the two of them start talking on the bench at the station and, eventually, at school as well.

Besides Nozomi and Shiro's ongoing love story the comic also deals with their schoolmates, including literature club president Marin Hamada, popular Kazuomi Tamaki, and Shiro's teen aunt, Suzu.

Publication
Our Precious Conversations is written and illustrated by Robico. It started serialization in Kodansha's magazine Dessert on August 24, 2015. The first tankōbon volume was released on March 11, 2016. The series went on hiatus in the July 2016 issue of Dessert, but returned in the January 2017 issue. The series concluded on December 24, 2019. The seventh and final volume was released on March 13, 2020, in both a standard and limited edition.

In May 2017, Kodansha USA started publishing the series digitally. They later started publishing the series' chapters simultaneously with the Japanese release on digital sites such as Crunchyroll Manga.

Volume list

Reception
As of January 2019, the series has 700,000 copies in print.

In the 2017 edition of Takarajimasha's Kono Manga ga Sugoi! guidebook, the series ranked eighth on the top 20 manga for female audiences list. In 2019, the series was nominated for the 43rd Kodansha Manga Award in the shōjo category. However, it lost to Rie Aruga's Perfect World. In 2020, it won the 44th Kodansha Manga Award in the shōjo category.

References

Further reading

External links
 Official website at Dessert 
 

Kodansha manga
Romantic comedy anime and manga
School life in anime and manga
Shōjo manga
Winner of Kodansha Manga Award (Shōjo)
Works published under a pseudonym